Mabuhay, officially the Municipality of Mabuhay (Chavacano: Municipalidad de Mabuhay), is a 4th class municipality in the province of Zamboanga Sibugay, Philippines. According to the 2020 census, it has a population of 37,390 people.

The municipality is located in the northeastern part of Olutanga Island.

Geography

Barangays
Mabuhay is politically subdivided into 18 barangays.

Climate

Demographics

Economy

References

External links
 Mabuhay Profile at PhilAtlas.com
 [ Philippine Standard Geographic Code]
 Philippine Census Information
 https://web.archive.org/web/20080508205738/http://digitalmabuhay.com/

Municipalities of Zamboanga Sibugay